Soledad's Shawl (Spanish: El rebozo de Soledad) is a 1952 Mexican western film directed by Roberto Gavaldón and starring Arturo de Córdova, Pedro Armendáriz, and Estela Inda. The film's sets were designed by the art director Salvador Lozano Mena. In the film, a doctor moves to a poor rural area where he falls in love with a peasant girl.

Cast
 Arturo de Córdova as Dr. Alberto Robles  
 Pedro Armendáriz as Roque Suazo  
 Estela Inda as Soledad 
 Domingo Soler as Father Juan  
 Carlos López Moctezuma as David Acosta  
 Jaime Fernández as Mauro  
 Rosaura Revueltas as Mother of baby 
 Manuel Arvide as Doctor  
 José Baviera as Doctor  
 Guillermo Calles 
 Lupe Carriles as Receptionist 
 Felipe de Flores 
 Norma Giménez 
 Gilberto González 
 Francisco Jambrina as Alfonso Gómez Ugarte  
 Mario Humberto Jiménez Pons 
 Mario Jiménez 
 José María Linares-Rivas as Doctor  
 José Muñoz 
 Lucrecia Muñoz as La novia  
 Yolanda Nieto 
 Juan Orraca 
 Ignacio Peón 
 Hernán Vera as Mayor

References

Bibliography 
  Erica Segre. Intersected Identities: Strategies of Visualisation in Nineteenth- and Twentieth-century Mexican Culture. Berghahn Books, 2007.

External links 
 

1952 films
1952 Western (genre) films
Mexican Western (genre) films
1950s Spanish-language films
Films directed by Roberto Gavaldón
Mexican black-and-white films
1950s Mexican films